Susanna Batazzi (born 29 August 1957) is an Italian fencer. She competed at the 1976 and 1980 Summer Olympics.

References

External links
 

1957 births
Living people
Italian female fencers
Olympic fencers of Italy
Fencers at the 1976 Summer Olympics
Fencers at the 1980 Summer Olympics
20th-century Italian women
21st-century Italian women